Mirko Pieri (born 24 July 1978) is an Italian football manager and former player, who played as a defender or midfielder.

Playing career
Pieri joined Sampdoria in July 2006 along with Fabio Quagliarella, as part of the deal to sign Salvatore Foti. In June 2008 Sampdoria acquired Pieri outright.

Pieri was then signed by Livorno in July 2009 for €300,000.

Pieri had a trial at the English Football League Championship club Middlesbrough F.C. in 2010, but Boro boss Gordon Strachan stated on the club's official website that Pieri will not be offered a deal.

Style of play
Primarily a left-sided attacking full-back or wing-back, Pieri was also capable of playing in a more advanced midfield role as a winger, on either flank, due to his dynamism, work-rate, energy, and tactical versatility, and was effective both offensively and defensively.

References

External links
 Scheda su Sampdoria.it
 

Italian footballers
Serie A players
Serie B players
F.C. Grosseto S.S.D. players
A.C. Perugia Calcio players
Udinese Calcio players
U.C. Sampdoria players
U.S. Livorno 1915 players
Association football midfielders
People from Grosseto
1978 births
Living people
Sportspeople from the Province of Grosseto
Footballers from Tuscany